Onnaam Muhurtham is a 1991 Indian Malayalam-language film, directed by Rahim Chelavoor. The film stars Mukesh, Sukumaran, Archana and Siddique in the lead roles. The film has musical score by Kannur Rajan.

Cast
Mukesh as  Vishwanathan
Sukumaran as Ananthan Nambiar
Archana as Radhika Vishwanath
Siddique as Kumaran
KPAC Sunny as Shekhara Kurup
K. R. Savithri
Mamukkoya as Sulaiman
Vijayaraghavan as William
Ajith Chandran
Sandhya rani

Soundtrack
The music was composed by Kannur Rajan with lyrics by Vijayan.

References

External links
 

1991 films
1990s Malayalam-language films